The Long Way is the ninth studio album released by American country music artist Doug Stone. It was his only release for the Audium Entertainment label, and its only single ("POW 369", also recorded by Darryl Worley on his 2002 album I Miss My Friend) failed to enter the Billboard country music charts.

The album's last three tracks are new re-recordings of songs previously included on Stone's earlier albums: "More Love" from the 1994 album of the same name, "Born in the Dark" from 1995's Faith in Me, Faith in You, and "I'd Be Better Off (In a Pine Box)" from his 1991 self-titled debut album.

Track listing
"I'm Losing You" (Monty Criswell, Tim Schoepf) – 3:19
"The Long Way" (Criswell, Billy Yates) – 3:43
"One Heartache at a Time" (Gary Burr, Cynthia Weil) – 3:53
"Poor Man's Blvd." (Doug Stone, Chet Hinesley) – 3:41
"POW 369" (Steven Dale Jones) – 3:26
"Bone Dry" (Will Robinson, Jimmy Yeary) – 3:27
"Lying to Myself" (Stone, Scott Shevel, Jimmy Devine, Lisa Zanghi) – 4:10
"More Love" (Burr, Stone) – 3:25
"Born in the Dark" (Hinesley) – 2:54
"I'd Be Better Off (In a Pine Box)" (Steve Clark, Johnny MacRae) – 3:24

Personnel
 Mark Beckett - drums
 Rick Brothers - drums
 Wesley Buttrey - drums
 Timotheo Gonzalez - harmonica
 Buddy Hyatt - piano, strings
 Dionna Brooks-Jackson - background vocals
 Curtis Jay - bass guitar
 Mike Johnson - dobro, pedabro, steel guitar
 Dick Justice - acoustic guitar, electric guitar
 Seidina Reed - background vocals
 Rusty Van Sickle - background vocals
 Doug Stone - lead vocals

2002 albums
E1 Music albums
Doug Stone albums